Turów or Turow may refer to:

Economy
Turów Coal Mine
Turów Power Station

Places in Poland
Turów, Gmina Głogów in Lower Silesian Voivodeship (south-west Poland)
Turów, Gmina Pęcław in Lower Silesian Voivodeship (south-west Poland)
Turów, Gmina Bogatynia a former village Lower Silesian Voivodeship (south-west Poland)
Turów, Lubin County in Lower Silesian Voivodeship (south-west Poland)
Turów, Wrocław County in Lower Silesian Voivodeship (south-west Poland)
Turów Zgorzelec - Polish basketball team, based in Zgorzelec
Turów, Łódź Voivodeship (central Poland)
Turów, Lublin Voivodeship (east Poland)
Turów, Masovian Voivodeship (east-central Poland)
Turów, Silesian Voivodeship (south Poland)
Turów, Lubusz Voivodeship (west Poland)
Turów, the Polish name of Turaŭ, Belarus

People
Scott Turow (born 1949), American author and lawyer

See also
Turov (disambiguation)